Ginger is a 1946 American comedy film directed by Oliver Drake and starring Frank Albertson, Barbara Read and Janet Burston. It was produced and distributed by Monogram Pictures.

Cast
 Frank Albertson as Barney O'Hara
 Barbara Read as 	Peggy Sullivan 
 Johnny Calkins as 	Chip O'Hara
 Janet Burston as 'Butch' Sullivan
 Gene Collins as Hector Tillford, Jr.
 Lee 'Lasses' White as Gramps McTavish
 Oliver Blake as City Treasurer Joseph Nash
 Dick Elliott as Mayor Hector Tillford
 Edythe Elliott as Mom Sullivan
 Wally Walker as 	Quimby
 Diane Jergens as 	Diane
 Donald Olson as 	Donald
 Napoleon as Ginger - The Dog

References

Bibliography
 Hanson, Patricia King. AFI Catalog of Motion Pictures Produced in the United States, 1941-1950. University of California Press, 1999.

External links
 

1946 films
1946 comedy films
American comedy films
American black-and-white films
Films directed by Oliver Drake
Monogram Pictures films
1940s English-language films
1940s American films